Casey Castle (born 22 August 1991) is a Bermudian footballer.

Club career

College
In 2008, Castle joined PHC Zebras. In 2010, Castle played college football for Thomas College in the United States. Scoring 11 goals in 16 games, he was named Rookie of the Year in the 2011 North Atlantic Conference while being named in the All-Tournament Team.

North America
In 2011, Castle joined Bermuda Hogges and finished sixth in his inaugural Premier Development League Mid Atlantic Division season.

In April 2014, he was drafted by Premier Development League side IMG Academy Bradenton. Following the dissolution of the Hogges, the club's owner ensured a deal could be completed after the side pulled out of the league prior to the 2013 season.

In 2015, Castle lined-up for Hamilton Paris. In March 2015, he took part in the Soccerviza Auburndale Florida Combine in Orlando and was offered trials in Iceland and Finland. In September 2015, Castle returned to PHC Zebras for a second spell.

England
In July 2016, Castle moved to England in hope of signing of a professional contract. In August 2016, he joined Combined Counties Premier Division club Walton & Hersham in the ninth tier. He made four league appearances for the Swans, as well as substitute cameos in the FA Vase and Combined Counties Challenge Cup.

Castle also made six appearances for the Walton & Hersham Reserves in the Suburban League South Division. His early performances saw him attract scouts from non-league clubs Dulwich Hamlet and Hampton & Richmond Borough, as well as Championship side Reading.

International career
In August 2008, Castle made his debut for Bermuda. Featuring against Saint Martin in a CONCACAF Gold Cup qualification match, he immediately scored a brace. He scored a third international goal in as many matches when Bermuda beat Grenada in March 2015.

At the youth level he featured on various squads ranging from under-14 to under-23.

International goals

Personal life
Castle is the son of former son PHC Zebras defender and coach Jack Castle. He majored in finance during his time in America.

References

1991 births
Living people
People from Southampton Parish, Bermuda
Association football forwards
Bermudian footballers
Bermuda international footballers
PHC Zebras players
Bermuda Hogges F.C. players
IMG Academy Bradenton players
Bermudian expatriate footballers
Walton & Hersham F.C. players
Expatriate soccer players in the United States
USL League Two players
Bermuda youth international footballers
Bermuda under-20 international footballers
Bermudian expatriate sportspeople in the United States
Indianapolis Greyhounds men's soccer players